In mathematics, the Bott cannibalistic class, introduced by , is an  element  of the representation ring of a compact Lie group that describes the action of the Adams operation  on the Thom class  of a complex representation .

References

Representation theory
K-theory